Center for Political and Social Studies Foundation (Fundación Centro de Estudios Políticos y Sociales) is a socialist, think tank that is headquartered in Valencia, Spain. The CEPS Foundation has been active in politics internationally, especially within countries in Latin America.

History

Origin
In 1993, the Center for Political and Social Studies Foundation (CEPS) was founded in Valencia, Spain by left-wing academics that were supporters of Spanish Socialist Workers' Party.

Staff
Staff for the CEP Foundation includes:
 President – Alberto Montero Soler
Vice President – Fabiola Meco Tébar
Executive Board – Luis Alegre Zahonero, Antonio de Cabo, Íñigo Errejón Galván, Pablo Iglesias Turrión, Adoración Guamán Hernández, Manolo Monereo, Alfredo Serrano Mancilla and Roberto Viciano Pastor

Contributions
According to Jon Perdue, CEPS created a team of "Marxist constitutional scholars" to write the new constitutions of multiple countries in Latin America. The CEPS Foundation calls Latin America "the most interesting laboratory of political and social transformation" and their experiences in the region "can be useful for generating dynamic of social transformation in Europe".

Bolivia

2009 Constitution of Bolivia

The contributions of the CEPS Foundation for the 2009 Constitution of Bolivia was mainly focused on the indigenous people of Bolivia.

Ecuador

2008 Constitution of Ecuador

The 2008 Constitution was also partially attributed to CEPS, with Ecuadorean President Rafael Correa stating in a radio interview that he paid advisors $18,000 a month for their assistance.

Venezuela

1999 Constitution of Venezuela

The CEPS Foundation contributed to the 1999 Constitution of Venezuela.

Political advising
According to the Venezuelan Ministry of Culture, the CEPS Foundation received $7 million for its advising services for the government of Hugo Chávez

External links
Archive of CEPS website

References

Socialist organizations